"17 år" is a song recorded by Swedish singer and songwriter Veronica Maggio for her second studio album, Och vinnaren är... (2008).

Music video
A music video to accompany the release of "17 år" was first released onto YouTube on 4 October 2008 at a total length of three minutes and fifty-six seconds.

Charts

Weekly charts

Year-end charts

Release history

References 

2009 songs
Songs written by Oskar Linnros
Songs written by Veronica Maggio
Swedish-language songs
Universal Music Group singles
Veronica Maggio songs